Francesco Maria Annoni, C.R. (1610 – 12 May 1674) was a Roman Catholic prelate who served as Bishop of Muro Lucano (1660–1674).

Biography
Francesco Maria Annoni was born in Milan, Italy in 1610 and ordained a priest in the Congregation of Clerics Regular of the Divine Providence.
On 21 June 1660, he was appointed during the papacy of Pope Alexander VII as Bishop of Muro Lucano. On 27 June 1660, he was consecrated bishop by Giulio Cesare Sacchetti, Cardinal-Bishop of Sabina, with Lorenzo Gavotti, Bishop Emeritus of Ventimiglia, and Giovanni Agostino Marliani, Bishop Emeritus of Accia and Mariana, serving as co-consecrators. He served as Bishop of Muro Lucano until his death on 12 May 1674.

Episcopal succession
While bishop, he was the principal co-consecrator of:
Giovanni Carlo Baldovinetti, Bishop of Sansepolcro (1667); and 
Domenico Trucchi, Bishop of Mondovi (1667).

See also 
Catholic Church in Italy

References

External links and additional sources
 (for Chronology of Bishops) 
 (for Chronology of Bishops) 

17th-century Italian Roman Catholic bishops
Bishops appointed by Pope Alexander VII
1610 births
1674 deaths
Clergy from Milan
Theatine bishops